Semeni may refer to:

 Semeni, a river in Cluj County, Romania
 Semeni, a village in the commune Zagarancea, Ungheni District, Moldova
 semeni (Turkish) or səməni (Azerbaijani), wheat sprouts traditionally grown as part of Nowruz celebration